Kılan (also known as ) is a village in Niğde Province, Turkey.

Kılan is a part of Ulukışla  (district) of Niğde Province at  Its population was 1916 as of 2010

Probably the earliest settlement was established during the Roman Empire era. About 250 years ago, during the Ottoman Empire era, a Turkmen tribe named  ('sons of Kılan')  settled around the village. However in 2015 the municipality was disestablished. 

The main economic activity is agriculture and animal husbandry. The main crop is cherry.

References

1989 establishments in Turkey
2015 disestablishments in Turkey
Villages in Ulukışla District